Nutaarmiut Island (old spelling: Nutârmiut) is an uninhabited island in Avannaata municipality in northwestern Greenland, with an area of .

Geography 
To the west, the Akornat Strait separates the island from Qaarsorsuaq Island. To the northwest and northeast, small channels separate the island from Aappilattoq Island and several smaller skerries on the southern coast of the inner Upernavik Icefjord.

The Ammarqua Strait separates Nutaarmiut Island from four large islands in the east, Uilortussoq Island and Saninngassoq Island in the north; Nako Island and Akuliaruseq Island in the south. The Eqalugaarsuit Sulluat Fjord opens into Ammarqua Strait immediately to the east of the southern cape. In the southeast, the Ineraq Island and the double Singarnaq-Annertussoq Island separate Nutaarmiut Island from the open Baffin Bay.

References 

Uninhabited islands of Greenland
Islands of the Upernavik Archipelago